Lady Seeks a Room is a 1937 Hungarian comedy film directed by Béla Balogh.

Cast 
 Irène Zilahy - Dr. Klári Székely
  - Dr. Sándor Lukács
 Gizi Lengyel - Jolán
 Ilona Kökény - Ilka
 Gyula Kabos - Ödön Csahos
 Andor Ajtay - Dr. Miklós Bognár

References

External links 

 mandarchiv.hu

1937 comedy films
1937 films
Hungarian comedy films
Films about divorce
Hungarian black-and-white films